The alveolar or postalveolar clicks are a family of click consonants found only in Africa and in the Damin ritual jargon of Australia. The tongue is more or less concave (depending on the language), and is pulled down rather than back as in the palatal clicks, making a hollower sound than those consonants.

The symbol is not an exclamation mark in origin, but rather a vertical bar with a subscript dot, the dot being the old diacritic for retroflex consonants. Prior to 1989,  (stretched c) was the IPA letter for the alveolar clicks, and this is still preferred by some phoneticians. Either letter may be combined with a second letter to indicate the manner of articulation, though this is commonly omitted for tenuis clicks.

In official IPA transcription, the click letter is combined with a  via a tie bar, though  is frequently omitted. Either letter, whether baseline or superscript, is usually placed before the click letter, but may come after when the release of the velar or uvular occlusion is audible. A third convention is the click letter with diacritics for voicelessness, voicing and nasalization; it does not distinguish velar from uvular alveolar clicks. Common alveolar clicks are:

The last can be heard in the sound sample at right; non-native speakers tend to glottalize clicks to avoid nasalizing them. The nasal click may also be heard at the right.

In the orthographies of individual languages, the letters and digraphs for alveolar clicks may be based on either the vertical bar symbol of the IPA, or on the Latin  of Bantu convention. Khoekhoe and most Bushman languages use the former; Naro, Sandawe, and Zulu use the latter.

Features
Features of postalveolar clicks:

The forward place of articulation is alveolar or postalveolar, depending on the language, and apical, which means it is articulated with the tip of the tongue against the alveolar ridge or the roof of the mouth behind the alveolar ridge. (Damin contrasted these two articulations as separate phonemes.) The release is a sharp, plosive sound in southern Africa, but in Sandawe it may be percussive, with the underside of the tip of the tongue striking the floor of the mouth after the release of the click (see below), and in Hadza the release is often quite weak.

Occurrence
English does not have an alveolar click (or any other click consonant) as a phoneme, but a plain alveolar click does occur in mimesis, as a sound children use to imitate a horse trotting.

Percussive release

In Sandawe, alveolar clicks commonly have a ballistic release, with the underside of the tip of the tongue subsequently striking the floor of the mouth. This allophone has been called "flapped" and "slapped". Sometimes the percussive slap is louder than the release, resulting in a sound that has been characterized as a "cluck".

In Gan, the nursery rhyme is (disregarding tone),
 'a goose in the sky'
 'a duck on the ground'
 'a goose lays a goose egg, a goose hatches a goose'
 'a duck lays a duck egg, a duck hatches a duck'
where the  onsets are all pronounced .

"Fricated" alveolar clicks
A series of clicks in Ekoka !Kung have been variously described as retroflex or fricated palatal clicks.

See also
Bilabial click
Dental click
Lateral click
Palatal click
Retroflex click
Index of phonetics articles

References

External links
 

Alveolar consonants
Click consonants